The Memphis Blues were a Negro league baseball team from Memphis, Tennessee, that played in the minor league Negro Southern League in 1947.

References 

Negro league baseball teams
Baseball teams established in 1947
Sports clubs disestablished in 1947
B
Professional baseball teams in Tennessee
1947 establishments in Tennessee
1947 disestablishments in Tennessee
Defunct baseball teams in Tennessee
Baseball teams disestablished in 1947